Ümit Ergirdi (born 5 November 1981 in Berlin, Germany) is a former professional Turkish footballer.

Ergirdi made five appearances in the 3. Fußball-Liga for SV Babelsberg 03 before deciding to end his professional career and to finish his law studies at the Free University of Berlin.

References

External links 
 
 Ümit Ergirdi at Fupa

1981 births
Living people
Footballers from Berlin
Turkish footballers
Association football midfielders
3. Liga players
Regionalliga players
BFC Preussen players
Tennis Borussia Berlin players
SV Babelsberg 03 players
Free University of Berlin alumni
FC Viktoria 1889 Berlin players